A&E or A+E may refer to:

Music 
 A&E Records, a British record label
 A+E (album), 2012, by Graham Coxon
 "A&E" (song), 2008, by Goldfrapp
 "A+E" (song), 2012, by Clean Bandit

Television 
 A&E Networks, an American broadcasting company
 A&E (TV network), an American pay TV network
 A&E (German TV channel)
 A&E (Spanish and Portuguese TV channel)
 A&E (Australian TV channel)

Other uses
 Accident and emergency, a term for a hospital's emergency department

See also

AE (disambiguation)
ANE (disambiguation)
Adam and Eve